The list of shipwrecks in the 1700s includes ships sunk, foundered, grounded, or otherwise lost from 1700 to 1709.

1700

September

19 September

Unknown date

1701

February

25 February

December

Unknown date

1702

February

21 February

April

3 April

September

30 September

October

Unknown date

November

22 November

1703

January

7 January

November

25 November

27 November

December

2 December

Unknown date

1704

August

January

31 January

Unknown date

1705

Unknown date

1706

October

Unknown date

November

19 November

1707

October

22 October

December

31 December

Unknown date

1708

January

Unknown date

June

8 June

1709

Notes
 Until 1752, the year began on Lady Day (25 March) Thus 24 March 1700 was followed by 25 March 1701. 31 December 1701 was followed by 1 January 1701.

References

1700s